South Main Street Historic District may refer to:

South Main Street Apartments Historic District, Little Rock, Arkansas
South Main Street Commercial Historic District (Little Rock, Arkansas)
South Main Street Residential Historic District (Little Rock, Arkansas)
South Main and Washington Streets Historic District, Norwalk, Connecticut
South Main-South Lee Streets Historic District, Fitzgerald, Georgia
South Main Street Historic District (Statesboro, Georgia), listed on the National Register of Historic Places
South Main Street Residential Historic District (Statesboro, Georgia)
South Main Street Historic District (Watkinsville, Georgia)
South Main and South Elm Streets Historic District, Henderson, Kentucky, listed on the National Register of Historic Places
South Main Street Historic District (Versailles, Kentucky), listed on the National Register of Historic Places
South Main Street Historic District (Walton, Kentucky), listed on the National Register of Historic Places
South Main Historic District (Grenada, Mississippi), listed on the National Register of Historic Places
South Main Street Historic District (Fayette, Missouri)
South Main Street Historic District (Joplin, Missouri)
South Main Street Historic District (Kernersville, North Carolina)
South Main Street Historic District (Geneva, New York)
South Main Street Historic District (Mount Morris, New York)
South Main Street District (Middletown, Ohio)
South Main Street District (Poland, Ohio), listed on the National Register of Historic Places
South Main Street Commercial Historic District (Pendleton, Oregon), listed on the National Register of Historic Places
South Main Street Historic District (Coventry, Rhode Island)
South Main Street Historic District (Woonsocket, Rhode Island)
South Main Historic District (Bishopville, South Carolina)
South Main Street Historic District (Covington, Tennessee), listed on the National Register of Historic Places
South Main Street Historic District (Memphis, Tennessee)
South Main Street Historic District (Pikeville, Tennessee) listed on the National Register of Historic Places
South Main Street Historic District (Fort Worth, Texas) listed on the National Register of Historic Places
South Main Street Historic District (Fond du Lac, Wisconsin)
South Main Street Historic District (Janesville, Wisconsin)
South Main Street Historic District (Oregon, Wisconsin)

See also
South Main Street District (disambiguation)
South Main Street Commercial Historic District (disambiguation)
South Main Street Residential Historic District (disambiguation)
Main Street Historic District (disambiguation)
North Main Street Historic District (disambiguation)
East Main Street Historic District (disambiguation)
West Main Street Historic District (disambiguation)